The Kabarda, Kabardin or Circassian horse is a breed from the Caucasus, originating from Eastern Circassia, currently part of the Kabardino-Balkaria region of Russia. Historically the breed has been known for at least 400 years, but its origins are probably as old as the Hittite civilization. These horses are noted for their endurance and ease to adapt in difficult environments.

History

The Kabarda has been bred since the 16th century by mountain tribesmen in the northern Caucasus, and is the product of centuries of selective breeding for the ability to survive in harsh conditions. The Kabarda breed was formed from a combination of steppe horses, the Karabakh, the Arabian and the Turkoman.  The breed are usually kept in herds, and are moved between mountain pastures in the summer and foothills areas in the winter.   A theory exists that Kabardian and Cleveland Bay breeds may have common origins.

At the beginning of the 20th century, Count Stroganov began a program of crossing Kabardas with Arabians, and the results were considered satisfactory. After the 1917 Russian Revolution, the numbers of Kabarda were hugely reduced, and during the 1920s efforts were made to re-establish the breed.  Between 1935 and 1953, the purebred population averaged 446 stallions and 3272 mares.  During early half of the twentieth century, a new breed, called the Anglo-Kabarda was formed by crossing Kabardas with Thoroughbreds, and in 1966 the new breed was recognized.  By the late 1980s the number of purebred Kabarda breeding mares had dropped to between 400 and 450, concentrated mainly at the Malokarachaevski and Malkinski studs and other breeding farms in the Kabardino-Balkaria region, including the Krasny Partizan collective farm in the Stavropol territory.

Breed characteristics

They are a solid, cleanly built horse with a clean head, a well-muscled neck, medium-high withers, a deep chest, long, sloping shoulders, a short, solid back, and a muscular, slightly sloping croup. Their legs are correctly set, with clean, well-developed joints and hard hooves. The Kabardas' blood has a heightened oxidizing capacity, useful for work high in the mountains. The breed also is an easy keeper, that is, it has a tendency to accumulate fat quickly, which helps when the horses are exposed to extreme conditions on a regular basis, but can be a hardship for owners when the horses are kept stabled.

Sub-Types

There are three main subtypes of the Kabarda breed:

Basic type – This is the predominant type, a typical mountain riding horse that is rangy but well-muscled.
Oriental type – This type shows a more Arabian influence, with smaller heads, very clean legs, thinner skins, and hotter temperaments.
Massive type – This type is bigger, with a more robust bone structure similar to a typical carriage horse.

Uses
The Kabarda horse has been bred for stony and mountainous terrain.  The breed is usually fast and has good endurance.  They are often used as a sport horse outside of Russia, and for the creation and improvement of other breeds, such as the Anglo-Kabarda, the Tersky, and native stock in Armenia, Azerbaijan and Georgia.  Although they are mainly used as a saddle horse, they have work well in harness and as a pack horse.  The mountain tribesmen of the Caucasus make hay on steep slopes by hitching Kabardas to horse-drawn mowers.

See also
Karachay horse
Karabakh horse

References

External links 
 Kabarda horses homepage
INTERNATIONAL KABARDIAN HORSE ASSOCIATION (IKHA), Munich, Bavaria, Germany

Horse breeds
Horse breeds originating in Russia